The African humid period (AHP; also known by other names) is a climate period in Africa during the late Pleistocene and Holocene geologic epochs, when northern Africa was wetter than today. The covering of much of the Sahara desert by grasses, trees and lakes was caused by changes in Earth's orbit around the Sun; changes in vegetation and dust in the Sahara which strengthened the African monsoon; and increased greenhouse gases.

During the preceding Last Glacial Maximum, the Sahara contained extensive dune fields and was mostly uninhabited. It was much larger than today, and its lakes and rivers such as Lake Victoria and the White Nile were either dry or at low levels. The humid period began about 14,600–14,500 years ago at the end of Heinrich event 1, simultaneously to the Bølling–Allerød warming. Rivers and lakes such as Lake Chad formed or expanded, glaciers grew on Mount Kilimanjaro and the Sahara retreated. Two major dry fluctuations occurred; during the Younger Dryas and the short 8.2 kiloyear event. The African humid period ended 6,000–5,000 years ago during the Piora Oscillation cold period. While some evidence points to an end 5,500 years ago, in the Sahel, Arabia and East Africa, the period appears to have taken place in several steps such as the 4.2-kiloyear event.

The AHP led to a widespread settlement of the Sahara and the Arabian Deserts, and had a profound effect on African cultures, such as the birth of the Ancient Egyptian civilization. People in the Sahara lived as hunter-gatherers and domesticated cattle, goats and sheep. They left archaeological sites and artifacts such as one of the oldest ships in the world, and rock paintings such as those in the Cave of Swimmers and in the Acacus Mountains. Earlier humid periods in Africa were postulated after the discovery of these rock paintings in now-inhospitable parts of the Sahara. When the period ended, humans gradually abandoned the desert in favour of regions with more secure water supplies, such as the Nile Valley and Mesopotamia, where they gave rise to early complex societies.

Research history 

Herodotus in 440 BC and Strabo in 23 AD discussed the existence of a greener Sahara, although their reports were at first questioned owing to their anecdotal nature. In 1850 the researcher Heinrich Barth discussed the possibility of past climate change leading to increased wetness in the Sahara after discovering petroglyphs in the Murzuq Desert, and further discoveries of petroglyphs led desert explorer László Almásy to coin the concept of a Green Sahara in the 1930s. Later in the 20th century, conclusive evidence of a past greener Sahara, the existence of lakes and higher Nile flow levels was increasingly reported and it was recognized that the Holocene featured a humid period in the Sahara.

The idea that changes in Earth's orbit around the Sun influence the strength of the monsoons was already advanced in 1921, and while the original description was partly inaccurate, later widespread evidence for such orbital controls on climate was found. At first it was believed that humid periods in Africa correlate with glacial stages ("pluvial hypothesis") before radiocarbon dating became widespread.

The development and existence of the African humid period has been investigated with archaeology, climate modelling and paleoproxies, with archaeological sites, dunes and deposits left by lakes, aeolian deposits and leaf wax in the sea and wetlands playing an important role. Pollen, lake deposits and former levels of lakes have been used to study the ecosystems of the African humid period, and charcoal and leaf impressions have been used to identify vegetation changes. The time 6,000 years ago has received particular attention, especially since that period of the AHP has been used as an experiment in the Paleoclimate Modelling Intercomparison Project. Most recently, the effects of the Sahara greening on other continents has drawn scientific attention.

Research issues 

While the precipitation changes since the last glacial cycle are well established, the magnitude and timing of the changes are unclear. Depending on how and where measurements and reconstructions are made, different beginning dates, ending dates, durations and precipitation levels have been determined for the African humid period. The amounts of precipitation reconstructed from paleoclimate records and simulated by climate modelling are often inconsistent with each other; in general, the simulation of the Green Sahara is considered a problem for earth system models. Erosion of lake sediments and carbon reservoir effects make it difficult to date when they dried up. Vegetation changes by themselves do not necessarily indicate precipitation changes, as changes in seasonality, plant species composition and changes in land use also play a role in vegetation changes. Isotope ratios such as the hydrogen/deuterium ratio that have been used to reconstruct past precipitation values likewise are under the influence of various physical effects, which complicates their interpretation. Most records of Holocene precipitation in eastern Africa come from low altitudes.

Terminology 

The term "African humid period" was coined in 2000 by deMenocal et al.. Earlier humid periods are sometimes known as "African humid periods" and a number of dry/wet periods have been defined for the Central Africa region. In general, these types of climate fluctuations between wetter and drier periods are known as "pluvials" and "interpluvials", respectively. Because the AHP did not affect all of Africa, Williams et al. 2019 recommended that the term be dropped, and some researchers have specified "North African humid period" and "Northern African humid period".

Other terms that have been applied to the Holocene AHP or correlative climate phases are "Holocene humid period", which also covers an analogous episode in Arabia and Asia; "early to mid-Holocene humid episode"; "Holocene Pluvial"; "Holocene Wet Phase"; "" in Central Africa; "Makalian" for the Neolithic period of northern Sudan; "Nabtian Wet Phase" or "Nabtian period" for the 14,000–6,000 humid period over the Eastern Mediterranean and Levant; "Neolithic pluvial"; "Neolithic Subpluvial"; "Neolithic wet phase"; "" of the Western Sahara 6,500 – 4,000 years before present; "Subpluvial II" and "" in the Central Sahara 14,000 – 7,500 years before present. The terms "" and  have been applied to the dry period in the last glacial maximum, the latter is equivalent to the "Kanemian"; "Kanemian dry period" refers to a dry period between 20,000 and 13,000 years before present in the Lake Chad area.

Background and beginning 

The African humid period took place in the late Pleistocene and early-middle Holocene, and saw increased precipitation in Northern and Western Africa due to a northward migration of the tropical rainbelt. The AHP is the most profound climate change of the low latitudes during the last 100,000 years and stands out within the otherwise relatively climatically stable Holocene. It is part of the so-called Holocene climatic optimum and coincides with a global warm phase, the Holocene Thermal Maximum. Liu et al. 2017 subdivided the humid period into an "AHP I" which lasted until 8,000 years ago, and an "AHP II" from 8,000 years onward, with the former being wetter than the latter.

The African humid period was not the first such phase; evidence for about 230 older such "green Sahara"/wet periods exist going back perhaps to the first appearance of the Sahara 7–8 million years ago, for example during Marine Isotope Stage 5 a and c. Earlier humid periods appear to have been more intense than the AHP of the Holocene, including the exceptionally intense Eemian humid period. This humid period provided the pathways for early humans to cross Arabia and Northern Africa and which, together with later moist periods, has been linked to expansions of the Aterian populations and the speciation of insect species. Such humid periods are usually associated with interglacials, while glacial stages correlate to dry periods.

The Bølling-Allerød warming appears to be synchronous with the onset of the African humid period as well as to increased humidity in Arabia. Later, in the Blytt–Sernander sequence the humid period coincides with the Atlantic period.

Conditions before the African humid period 

During the Last Glacial Maximum, the Sahara and Sahel had been extremely dry with less precipitation than today as reflected by the extent of dune sheets and water levels in closed lakes. The Sahara was much larger, extending  farther south to about 12° northern latitude. Dunes were active much closer to the equator, and rainforests had retreated in favour of afromontane and savannah landscapes as temperatures, rainfall, and humidity decreased.

There is little and often equivocal evidence of human activity in the Sahara or Arabia at that time, reflecting its drier nature; in the Acacus Mountains the last human presence was recorded 70,000-61,000 years ago and by the LGM humans had largely retreated to the Mediterranean coast and the Nile Valley. The aridity during the Last Glacial Maximum appears to have been the consequence of the colder climate and larger polar ice sheets, which squeezed the monsoon belt to the equator and weakened the West African Monsoon. The atmospheric water cycle and the Walker and Hadley circulations were weaker as well. Exceptional dry phases are linked to Heinrich events when there are a large number of icebergs in the North Atlantic; the discharge of large amounts of such icebergs between 11,500 and 21,000 years before present coincided with droughts in the subtropics.

Before the onset of the AHP, it is thought that the Lake Victoria, Albert, Edward, Turkana and the Sudd swamps had dried out. The White Nile had become a seasonal river whose course along with that of the main Nile may have been dammed by dunes. The Nile Delta was partially dry, with sandy plains extending between ephemeral channels and exposed seafloor, and it became a source of sand for ergs farther east. Other lakes across Africa, such as Lake Chad and Lake Tanganyika, also had shrunk during this time, and both the Niger River and Senegal River were stunted.

Early humidity increases 

Whether some parts of the desert such as highlands like the Red Sea Hills were reached by the westerlies or weather systems associated with the subtropical jet stream—and thus received precipitation—is contentious. It is only clearly supported for the Maghreb in northwestern Africa, though river flow/terrace formation and lake development in the Tibesti and Jebel Marra mountains and residual Nile flow may be explained in this way. The highlands of Africa appear to have been less affected by drought during the last glacial maximum.

The end of the glacial drought occurred between 17,000 and 11,000 years ago, with an earlier beginning noted in the Saharan mountains (possibly) 18,500 years ago. In southern and central Africa earlier starts 17,000 and 17,500 years ago, respectively, may be linked to Antarctic warming, while Lake Malawi appears to have been low until about 10,000 years ago.

High lake levels occurred in the Jebel Marra and Tibesti Mountains between 15,000 and 14,000 years ago and the youngest stage of glaciation in the High Atlas mountains took place at the same time as the Younger Dryas and early African humid period. Around 14,500 years ago, lakes started to appear in the arid areas.

Onset 

The humid period began about 15,000-14,500 years ago. The onset of the humid period took place almost simultaneously over all of Northern and Tropical Africa, with impacts as far as Santo Antão on Cape Verde. In Arabia, wet conditions apparently took about two millennia to advance northward, a gradual advance is supported by tephrochronological data. Likewise, in the Sahara there might have been a delay of about a millennium between the onset of the AHP and the full establishment of humid conditions, as vegetation growth and the filling of river systems took time.

Lake Victoria reappeared and overflowed; Lake Albert also overflowed into the White Nile 15,000–14,500 years ago and so did Lake Tana, into the Blue Nile. The White Nile flooded part of its valley and reconnected to the main Nile. In Egypt widespread flooding by the "Wild Nile" took place; this "Wild Nile" period led to the largest recorded floods on this river, sedimentation in floodplains, and probably also impacted human populations along the river. Even earlier, 17,000–16,800 years ago, meltwater from glaciers in Ethiopia – which were retreating at that time – may have begun to increase the flow of water and sediment in the Nile. In the East African Rift water levels in lakes began to rise by about 15,500/15,000-12,000 years ago; Lake Kivu began overflowing into Lake Tanganyika by about 10,500 years ago.

About the same time that the AHP started, the cold glacial climate in Europe associated with Heinrich event 1 ended with climate changing as far as Australasia. A warming and retreat of sea ice around Antarctica coincides with the start of the African humid period, although the Antarctic Cold Reversal also falls into this time and may relate to a drought interval recorded in the Gulf of Guinea.

Causes 

The African humid period was caused by a stronger West African Monsoon directed by changes in solar irradiance and in albedo feedbacks. These led to increased moisture import from both the equatorial Atlantic into West Africa, as well as from the North Atlantic and the Mediterranean Sea towards the Mediterranean coasts of Africa. There were complex interactions with the atmospheric circulation of the extratropics and between moisture coming from the Atlantic Ocean and the Indian Ocean, and an increased overlap between the areas wetted by the monsoon and those wetted by extratropical cyclones.

Climate models indicate that changes from a dry to a green Sahara and back have threshold behaviour, with the change occurring once a certain level of insolation is exceeded; likewise, a gradual drop of insolation often leads to a sudden transition back to a dry Sahara. This is due to various feedback processes which are at work, and in climate models there is often more than one stable climate-vegetation state. Sea surface temperature and greenhouse gas changes synchronized the beginning of the AHP across Africa.

Orbital changes 

The African humid period has been explained by increased insolation during Northern Hemisphere summer. Due to precession, the season at which Earth passes closest to the Sun on its elliptical orbit – the perihelion – changes, with maximum summer insolation occurring when this happens during Northern Hemisphere summer. Between 11,000 and 10,000 years ago, Earth passed through the perihelion at the time of summer solstice, increasing the amount of solar radiation by about 8%, resulting in the African monsoon becoming both stronger and reaching farther north. Between 15,000 and 5,000 years ago, summer insolation was at least 4% higher than today. The obliquity also decreased during the Holocene but the effect of obliquity changes on the climate is focused on the high latitudes and its influence on the monsoon is unclear.

During summer, solar heating is stronger over the North African land than over the ocean, forming a low pressure area that draws moist air and precipitation in from the Atlantic Ocean. This effect was strengthened by the increased summer insolation, leading to a stronger monsoon that also reached farther north. The effects of these circulation changes reached as far as the subtropics.

Obliquity and precession are responsible for two of the foremost Milankovich cycles and are responsible not only for the onset and cessation of ice ages but also for monsoon strength variations. Southern Hemisphere monsoons are expected to have the opposite response of Northern Hemisphere monsoons to precession, as the insolation changes are reversed; this observation is borne out by data from South America. The precession change increased seasonality in the Northern Hemisphere while decreasing it in the Southern Hemisphere.

Albedo feedbacks 

According to climate modelling, orbital changes by themselves cannot increase precipitation over Africa enough to explain the formation of the large desert lakes such as  Lake Megachad or the northward expansion of vegetation unless ocean and land surface changes are factored in.

Decreasing albedo resulting from vegetation changes is an important factor in the precipitation increase. Specifically, increased precipitation increases the amount of vegetation; vegetation absorbs more sunlight and thus more energy is available for the monsoon. In addition, evapotranspiration from vegetation adds more moisture, although this effect is less pronounced than the albedo effect. Heat fluxes in the soil and evaporation are also altered by the vegetation.

Reduced dust generation from a wetter Sahara influences the climate by reducing the amount of light absorbed by dust and also modifying cloud properties, making them less reflective and more efficient at inducing precipitation. In climate models, reduced amounts of dust in the troposphere together with vegetation changes can often but not always explain the northward expansion of the monsoon. There is not universal agreement on the effects of dust on precipitation in the Sahel, however, in part because the effects of dust on precipitation may be dependent on its size.

In addition to raw precipitation changes, changes in precipitation seasonality such as the length of dry seasons need to be considered when assessing the effects of climate change on vegetation, as well as the fertilizing effects of increased carbon dioxide concentrations in the atmosphere.

Other sources of albedo changes:
 Changes in soil properties result in changes in the monsoon; replacing desert soils with loamy ones results in increased precipitation, and soils that are wet or contain organic matter reflect less sunlight and accelerate the moistening process. Desert sand changes also modify the albedo.
 Albedo changes caused by lakes and wetlands can alter precipitation in climate models.

Intertropical Convergence Zone changes 

Warmer extratropics during summer may have drawn the Intertropical Convergence Zone (ITCZ) northward, resulting in precipitation changes. Sea surface temperatures off North Africa warmed under orbital effects and through weaker trade winds, leading to a northward movement of the ITCZ and increasing moisture gradients between land and sea. Two temperature gradients, one between a cooler Atlantic during spring and an already warming African continent, the other between warmer temperatures north of 10° latitude and cooler south, may have assisted in this change. In Eastern Africa, ITCZ changes had relatively little effect on precipitation changes. The past position of the ITCZ in Arabia is also contentious.

Precipitation changes in East Africa 

The African humid period that took place in East Africa appears to have been caused by different mechanisms. Among the proposed mechanisms are decreased seasonality of precipitation due to increased dry season precipitation, shortening of the dry season, increased precipitation and increased inflow of moisture from the Atlantic and Indian Oceans. The Atlantic moisture inflow was in part triggered by a stronger West African and Indian monsoon, perhaps explaining why the effects of the AHP extended into the Southern Hemisphere. The behaviour of the easterly trade winds is unclear; increased moisture transport by easterly trade winds may have aided in the development of the AHP but alternatively a stronger Indian Monsoon that draws easterly winds away from East Africa may have occurred.

Changes in the Congo Air Boundary or increased convergence along this boundary may have contributed; the Congo Air Boundary would have been shifted east by the stronger westerly winds directed by lower atmospheric pressure over Northern Africa, allowing additional moisture from the Atlantic to reach East Africa. The parts of East Africa that were isolated from Atlantic moisture did not become significantly wetter during the AHP although at one site in Somalia the seasonality of precipitation may or may not have decreased.

Various contributing factors may have led to the increased humidity in East Africa, not all of which were necessarily operating simultaneously during the AHP. That the "African humid period" reached this part of Africa has been doubted. Finally, increased greenhouse gas concentrations may have been involved in directing the onset of the AHP in tropical southeastern Africa; there, orbital changes would be expected to lead to climate variations opposite to those in the Northern Hemisphere. The pattern of humidity changes in south-eastern Africa are complex.

Additional factors 

 Climate change in the far northern latitudes may have contributed to the onset of the AHP. The shrinkage of the Scandinavian and the Laurentide Ice Sheets occurred at its beginning, and in climate models, a retreat of the ice sheets is often required to simulate the humid period although their size has little influence on its intensity. Their existence might also explain why the AHP did not start immediately with the early insolation peak, as still existing ice sheets would have cooled the climate.
 Sea surface temperature changes in the Atlantic influence the African monsoon and may have influenced the onset of the AHP. Weaker trade winds and higher insolation would lead to warmer sea surface temperatures, increasing precipitation by increasing moisture gradients between land and sea. Changes in North Atlantic temperature gradients were also involved.
 Warming of the Mediterranean Sea increases the amount of Sahel precipitation; this effect is responsible for the recent anthropogenic global warming mediated increase in Sahel precipitation. Warmer sea surface temperatures there might also explain the increased precipitation recorded in the Mediterranean and increased intensity of precipitation reconstructed from former rivers in the Sahara during the AHP.
 Increased precipitation during winter is correlated with a larger spatial extent of Mediterranean precipitation and might have aided in the establishment of the AHP, especially in North Africa including Algeria, Morocco and Northern Egypt, around the northern Red Sea, in the Tibesti and in northern Arabia and generally at higher latitudes where the monsoon did not arrive. This precipitation may have extended to other parts of the Sahara; such would have led to the areas of summer and winter precipitation overlapping and the dry area between the monsoonal and westerlies-influenced climate zones becoming wetter or disappearing altogether. Such changes in Mediterranean-derived precipitation may correlate with changes in the North Atlantic and Arctic Oscillations and with the increased contrast between warm summers and cold winters.
 Trough-mediated northward transport of moisture during autumn and spring has also been proposed to explain the increased precipitation and its underestimation by climate models. In one climate model, increased northward moisture transport by such troughs increases autumn rainfall in the Sahara, especially in the mid-Holocene and when the climate is already moister than usual there.
 Weaker subtropical anticyclones were proposed as an explanation during the 1970s–1980s.
 In montane regions such as the Meidob volcanic field cold temperatures after the last glacial maximum may have reduced evaporation and thus allowed an early onset of humidity.
 Changes in the Earth's geomagnetic field may be linked to the humidity changes.
 Increased moisture supply from larger lakes like Lake Megachad may have increased the precipitation, although this effect is probably not adequate to explain the entire AHP. A similar role has been attributed to the extensive wetlands, drainages and lakes in the Eastern Sahara and to the ecosystem in general.
 Two high elevation winds, the African Easterly Jet and the Tropical Easterly Jet modulate atmospheric air flows over Africa and thus also the amount of precipitation; the Tropical Easterly Jet comes from India and is powered by temperature gradients between the tropics and the subtropics while the African Easterly Jet is powered by temperature gradients in the Sahel. A stronger West African Monsoon resulted in a weaker African Easterly Jet and thus decreased transport of moisture out of Africa.
 Increased atmospheric carbon dioxide concentrations may have played a role in triggering the AHP, especially its extension across the equator, as well as its resumption after the Younger Dryas and Heinrich event 1 through increased sea surface temperatures. Carbon dioxide concentrations have a strong influence on the intensity of orbital changes needed to start an AHP but do not play a major role in controlling its intensity.
 In some parts of the Sahara increased water supply from montane regions may have assisted in the development of moist conditions.
 Larger forests in Eurasia may have led to a northward shift of the ITCZ.
 Other proposed mechanisms involve convection occurring above the atmospheric boundary layer, increased latent heat fluxes, low pressure in northwestern Africa drawing moisture into the Sahara, changes in the solar cycles and complex atmospheric flow phenomena.

Effects 

The African humid period extended over the Sahara as well as eastern, southeastern and equatorial Africa. In general, forests and woodlands expanded through the continent. A similar wet episode took place in the tropical Americas, China, Asia, India, the Makran region, the Middle East and the Arabian Peninsula and appears to relate to the same orbital forcing as the AHP. An early Holocene monsoonal episode extended as far as the Mojave Desert in North America. In contrast, a drier episode is recorded from much of South America where Lake Titicaca, Lake Junin, the discharge of the Amazon River and water availability in the Atacama were lower.

The discharge of the Congo, Niger, Nile, Ntem, Rufiji, and Sanaga rivers increased. Runoff from Algeria, equatorial Africa, northeastern Africa and the western Sahara was also larger. Changes in the morphology of the river systems and their alluvial plains occurred in response to the increased discharge, and the Senegal River expanded its riverbed, breached dunes and re-entered the Atlantic Ocean.

Flora and fauna of the Sahara 

During the African humid period, lakes, rivers, wetlands and vegetation including grass and trees covered the Sahara and Sahel creating a "Green Sahara" with a land cover that has no modern analogues. Evidence includes pollen data, archaeological sites, evidence of faunal activity such as diatoms, mammals, ostracods, reptiles and snails, buried river valleys, organic-rich mats, mudstones, evaporites as well as travertines and tufas deposited in subaqueous environments.

The vegetation cover then extended over almost all of the Sahara and consisted of an open grass savannah with shrubs and trees, with a moist savanna vegetation getting established in the mountains. In general, the vegetation expanded northward to 27–30° northern latitude in West Africa with a Sahel boundary at about 23° north, as the Sahara was populated by plants that today often occur about  farther south. The northward movement of vegetation took some time and some plant species moved faster than others. Plants that perform C3 carbon fixation became more common. The fire regime of the vegetation changed; in the desert the expansion of vegetation facilitated fire activity, while in the savanna the increased prevalence of woody vegetation reduced fire activity.

Forests and plants from the humid tropics were concentrated around lakes and rivers, which were also settled by aquatic and partially aquatic plants. The landscape during the AHP has been described as a mosaic between various vegetation types of semi-desert and humid origin rather than a simple northward displacement of plant species, and some brown or yellow vegetation communities persisted. There was no southward displacement of Mediterranean plants during the Holocene and on the Tibesti Mountains cold temperatures may have restricted the expansion of tropical plants. Pollen data often show a dominance of grasses over humid tropics trees. The tree Lophira alata and others may have spread out of the African forests during the AHP, and the Lactuca plants may have split into two species under the effects of the AHP and other climate changes in Africa during the Holocene.

The Sahara climate did not become entirely homogeneous; its central-eastern parts were probably drier than the western and central sectors and the Libyan sand sea was still a desert although pure desert areas retreated or became arid/semiarid. An arid belt may have existed north of 22° latitude, or the vegetation and the African monsoon might have reached 28–31° northern latitude; in general conditions between 21° and 28° northern latitude are poorly known. Dry areas may have persisted in the rain shadows of mountains and could have supported arid climate vegetation, explaining the presence of its pollen in sediment cores. In addition, north–south gradations in vegetation patterns have been reconstructed from charcoal and pollen data.

Fossils record changes in the animal fauna of the Sahara. This fauna included antelopes, baboons, cane rats, catfish, clams, cormorants, crocodiles, elephants, frogs, gazelles, giraffes, hartebeest, hares, hippos, molluscs, Nile perches, pelicans, rhinoceroses, snake-eagles, snakes, tilapia, toads, turtles and many more animals, and in Egypt there were African buffaloes, spotted hyenas, warthogs, wildebeest and zebra. Additional birds include brown-necked raven, coot, common moorhen, crested grebe, glossy ibis, long-legged buzzard, rock dove, spur-winged goose and tufted duck. Large herds of animals lived in the Sahara. Some animals expanded over the whole desert, while others were limited to places with deep water. Earlier humid periods in the Sahara may have allowed species to cross the now-desert. A reduction in open grasslands at the beginning of the AHP may explain the decline of the populations of some mammals during and a population bottleneck in cheetahs at the start of the humid period, while leading to the expansion of the population of other animals such as Hubert's multimammate mouse.

Lakes and rivers of the Sahara 

A number of lakes formed or expanded in the Sahara and the Hoggar and Tibesti Mountains. The largest of them was Lake Chad which increased to at least ten times its present-day size to form Lake Megachad. It influenced the climate itself; for example rainfall would have been reduced at the centre of the lake and increased at its margins. Lake Chad was possibly fed from the north by rivers draining the Hoggar (Taffassasset drainage) and Tibesti Mountains, from the Ennedi Mountains in the east through the "Eastern palaeorivers" and from the south by the Chari-Logone and Komadugu Rivers. The Chari River was the main tributary while the rivers draining the Tibesti formed alluvial fans/the Angamma river delta at their entry into northern Lake Chad. Skeletons of elephants, hippos and hominins have been found in the Angamma delta, which is the dominant shoreline feature of northern Lake Chad. The lake overflowed into the Niger River during highstand through the Mayo Kebbi and the Benue River, eventually reaching the Gulf of Guinea. Older dune systems were submerged by Lake Chad.

Among the large lakes which may have formed in the Sahara are Lake Megafezzan in Libya and Lake Ptolemy in Sudan. Quade et al. 2018 raised some doubts about the size and existence of some of these lakes such as Lake Ptolemy, Lake Megafezzan, Lake Ahnet-Mouydir; it is possible that giant lakes only formed in the southern part of the Sahara. Other lakes are known from Adrar Bous in Niger, Era Kohor and Trou au Natron in the Tibesti Mountains, I-n-Atei in the Hoggar, at Ine Sakane and in Taoudenni in Mali, the Garat Ouda and Takarkori Lakes in the Acacus Mountains, Chemchane in Mauretania, at Sebkha Mellala close to Ouargla in Algeria, at Wadi Shati and elsewhere in the Fezzan in Libya, at Bilma, Dibella, Fachi and Gobero in the Ténéré,  in Niger and at "Eight Ridges", El Atrun, Lake Gureinat, Merga, "Ridge", Sidigh, at Wadi Mansurab, Selima and Oyo in Sudan. The lakes of Ounianga merged into two large lakes and overflowed, either above surface or underground. Mosaics of small lakes developed in some regions, such as the Grand Erg Occidental. Wetlands also expanded during the AHP, but both their expansion and subsequent retreat were slower than that of lakes. The Niger River, which had been dammed by dunes during the LGM, formed a lake in the Timbuktu region that eventually overflowed and drained at some point during the AHP.

In some parts of the Sahara ephemeral lakes formed such as at Abu Ballas, Bir Kiseiba, Bir Sahara, Bir Tarfawi and Nabta Playa in Egypt, which may relate to later Egyptian religions, or swamp-lakes such as at Adrar Bous close to the Air Mountains. Ephemeral lakes developed between dunes, and a "freshwater archipelago" appears to have existed in the Murzuq basin. All these lake systems left fossils such as fish, limnic sediments  and fertile soils that were later used for agriculture (El Deir, Kharga Oasis). Finally, crater lakes formed in volcanic fields and sometimes survive to this day as smaller remnant lakes such as Malha crater in the Meidob volcanic field. Potentially, the increased availability of water during the AHP may have facilitated the onset of phreatomagmatic eruptions such as maar formation in the Bayuda volcanic field, although the chronology of volcanic eruptions there is not well known enough to substantiate a link to the AHP.

The large Tamanrasset River flowed from the Atlas Mountains and Hoggar westward towards the Atlantic and entered it in the Bay of Arguin in Mauretania. It once formed the 12th largest watershed in the world and left a submarine canyon and riverine sediments. Together with other rivers it formed estuaries and mangroves in the Bay of Arguin. Other rivers in the same area also formed submarine canyons, and sediment patterns in marine sediment cores and the occurrence of submarine landslides in the area have been related to the activity of these rivers.

Rivers such as the Irharhar in Algeria, Libya and Tunisia and the Sahabi and Kufra rivers in Libya were active during this time although there is some doubt that they had perennial flow; they appear to have been more important in earlier humid periods. Small watersheds, wadis and rivers discharging into endorheic basins such as Wadi Tanezzuft also carried water during the AHP. In Egypt, some rivers active during the AHP are now gravel ridges. In the Air, Hoggar and Tibesti Mountains, the so-called "Middle Terrace" was emplaced at this time. The rivers of the Sahara, lakes and their watersheds may have acted as pathways for the spread of humans and animals; the rivers were often connected to each other by alluvial fans. Proposed examples of animals that spread through rivers are the Nile crocodile and the fish Clarias gariepinus and Tilapia zillii. It is possible that the name Tassili n'Ajjer, which means "plateau of the rivers" in Berber, is a reference to past river flows. On the other hand, intense flows of these rivers may have made their shores dangerous to humans and thus created additional impetus for human movement. Now-dry river valleys from the AHP in the eastern Sahara have been used as analogues for former river systems on Mars.

Humans of the Sahara 

Conditions and resources were ripe for first hunter-gatherers, fishermen and, later, pastoralists; the exact chronology - when humans returned in the Sahara after the onset of the AHP - is disputed. They may have come either from the north (Maghreb or Cyrenaica) where the Capsian culture was located, the south (Sub-Saharan Africa), or the east (Nile Valley). The human population in the Sahara increased at the beginning of the AHP. Traces of human activity have been found in the Acacus Mountains where caves and rock shelters were used as basecamps for humans, such as the Uan Afuda cave and the Uan Tabu and Takarkori rock shelters. The first occupation in Takarkori took place between 10,000 and 9,000 years ago; about five millennia of human cultural evolution are recorded there. At Gobero in the Ténéré desert a cemetery has been found, which has been used to reconstruct the lifestyle of these former inhabitants of the Sahara, and at Lake Ptolemy in Nubia humans settled close to the lake shore, using its resources and perhaps even engaging in leisure activities. At that time, many humans appear to have depended on water-bound resources, seeing as many of the tools left by the early humans are associated with fishery; hence this culture is also known as "aqualithic" although substantial differences between the cultures of various places have been found. The greening of the Sahara led to a demographic expansion and especially in the Eastern Sahara human occupancy coincides with the AHP. Conversely occupation decreased along the Nile valley, perhaps due to the expansion of wetlands there and frequent large-scale flooding of the Nile delta.

Humans were hunting large animals with weapons that have been found in archaeological sites and wild cereals occurring in the Sahara during the AHP such as brachiaria, sorghum and urochloa were an additional source of food. Humans also domesticated cattle, goats and sheep. Cattle domestication may have occurred especially in the more environmentally variable Eastern Sahara, where the lack of lakes (cattle having high requirements of drinking water) may however have limited the occurrence of cattle. Animal husbandry picked up in earnest around 7,000 years ago when domestic animals came to the Sahara, and a population boom may be linked to this change in cultural practice; cattle and goats spread southwestwards from northeasternmost Africa from 8,000 years before present. Dairying has been demonstrated in some locations and cattle-husbandry is supported by the frequent depiction of cattle in rock paintings. The Dufuna canoe, one of the oldest known ships in the world, appears to date to the Holocene humid period and implies that the waterbodies of that time were navigated by humans. The cultural units "Masara" and "Bashendi" existed in Dakhleh Oasis during the AHP. In the Acacus Mountains, several cultural horizons known as Early and Late Acacus and Early, Middle, Late and Final Pastoral have been identified while in Niger the Kiffian culture has been related to the beginning of the AHP. Ancient civilizations thrived, with farming and animal husbandry taking place in Neolithic settlements. Possibly, the domestication of plants in Africa was delayed by the increased food availability during the AHP, it only took place around 2,500 BC.

Humans created rock art such as petroglyphs and rock paintings in the Sahara, perhaps the largest density of such creations in the world. Scenes include animals and everyday life such as swimming which supports the presence of past wetter climates. One well-known such petroglyph location is the Cave of Swimmers in the Gilf Kebir mountains of Egypt; other well known sites are the Gabal El Uweinat mountains also of Egypt, Arabia and the Tassili n'Ajjer in Algeria where rock paintings from this time have been discovered. Humans also left artifacts such as Fesselsteine and ceramics in what today are inhospitable deserts. North Africa together with East Asia is one of the first places where pottery was developed probably under the influence of increased availability of resources during the AHP. The humid period also favoured its development and spread in West Africa during the 10th millennium BC; the so-called "wavy line" or "dotted wavy-line" motif was widespread across Northern Africa and as far as Lake Turkana.

These populations have been described as Epipaleolithic, Mesolithic and Neolithic and produced a variety of lithic tools and other assemblages. In West Africa, the cultural change from the African Middle Stone Age to the Late Stone Age accompanied the beginning of the AHP. Genetic and archaeological data indicate that these populations which exploited the resources of the AHP Sahara probably originated in Sub-Saharan Africa and moved north after some time, after the desert got wetter; this may be reflected in the northward spread of Macrohaplogroup L and Haplogroup U6 genomic lineages. In return, the AHP facilitated the movement of some Eurasian populations into Africa, and bidirectional travel across the Sahara more generally. These favourable conditions for human populations may be reflected in paradise myths such as the Garden of Eden in The Bible and Elysium and the Golden Age in Classical Antiquity, and in the spread of the Nilo-Saharan languages.

Additional manifestations in the Sahara 

The expanded vegetation and soil formation stabilized previously active dunes, eventually giving rise to the present-day draa dunes in the Great Sand Sea of Egypt for example, although there is uncertainty about whether this stabilization was widespread. Soil development and biological activity in soils are attested in the Acacus Mountains and the Mesak Settafet area of Libya, but evidence of soil formation/pedogenesis such as bog iron are described from other parts of the Sahara as well. In the Selima Sand Sheet, the landscape underwent erosional truncation and bioturbation. The Central and Southern Sahara saw the development of alluvial deposits while sebkha deposits are known from the Western Sahara. Lightning strikes into soil left lightning-altered rocks in parts of the Central Sahara.

The increased precipitation also resulted in recharged aquifers such as the Nubian Sandstone Aquifer; presently, water from this aquifer maintains several lakes in the Sahara, such as the Lakes of Ounianga. Other groundwater systems were active at that time in the Acacus Mountains, Air Mountains, in the Fezzan and elsewhere in Libya and the Sahel. Raised groundwater tables provided water to plants and was discharged in depressions, lakes and valleys, forming widespread carbonate deposits and feeding lakes.

The formation of lakes and vegetation reduced the export of dust from the Sahara. This has been recorded in marine cores, including one core where dust export decreased by almost half, and in Italian lakes. In coastal places, such as in Oman, sea level rise also reduced the production of dust. In the Mediterranean, a decreased dust supply was accompanied by increased sediment input from the Nile, leading to changes in marine sediment composition.

Whether the strengthening of the monsoon enhanced or reduced upwelling off Northwestern Africa is debatable, with some research suggesting that the strengthening in upwelling decreased sea surface temperatures and increased the biological productivity of the sea, while other research suggests that the opposite occurred; less upwelling with more moisture. However, regardless of whether upwelling increased or decreased, it is possible that the strengthening of the monsoon boosted productivity off the coasts of Northern Africa because the increased river discharge delivered more nutrients to the sea. The decline of dust input may have caused the cessation of deep-water coral growth in the eastern Atlantic during the AHP by starving them of nutrients.

Arabia 

Precipitation in Dhofar and southwestern Arabia is brought by the African monsoon, and a change to a wetter climate resembling Africa has been noted in southern Arabia and Socotra from cave and river deposits. It possibly reached as far as Qatar. Holocene paleolakes are recorded at Tayma, Jubbah, in the Wahiba Sands of Oman and at Mundafan. In the Rub al-Khali lakes formed between 9,000 and 7,000 years ago and dunes were stabilized by vegetation, although the formation of lakes there was less pronounced than in the Pleistocene. The Wadi ad-Dawasir river system in central Saudi Arabia became active again with increased river runoff into the Persian Gulf. Wadis in Oman eroded across LGM dunes and formed accumulation terraces. Episodes of increased river discharge occurred in Yemen and increased precipitation is recorded in the caves of Hoti, Qunf in Oman, Mukalla in Yemen and Hoq Cave in Socotra. Increased precipitation resulted in increased groundwater flow, generating groundwater-fed lakes and carbonate deposits.

Forests and wildfire activity expanded across parts of Arabia. Freshwater sources in Arabia during the AHP became focus points of human activity and herding activity between mountains and lowlands occurred. In addition, karstic activity took place on exposed coral reefs in the Red Sea and traces of it are still recognizable today. Increased precipitation has been also invoked to explain decreased salinities in the Red Sea. Rock art depicts wildlife that existed in Arabia during the humid period. Archaeological sites such as cairns appeared with the beginning of the humid period.

The humid period in Arabia did not last as long as in Africa, deserts did not retreat as much and precipitation may not have reached the central and northern part of the peninsula past Oman and the Yemen Highlands; northern Arabia remained somewhat drier than southern Arabia, droughts were still common and the land and still produced dust. Whether some former lakes in Arabia were actually marshes is contentious.

East Africa 

Nile discharge was higher than today and during the early African humid period, the Nile in Egypt flooded up to  higher than it did recently before flood control. The increased flooding may have turned the Nile Valley marshy and inhospitable and could explain why many archaeological sites along the Nile were abandoned during the AHP, with violent conflicts reconstructed from the Jebel Sahaba archaeological site. Early after the Younger Dryas, the Blue Nile would have been the major source of waters for the Nile. Wetlands and anastomosing channels developed in the Nile Delta as sediment supply increased. In addition, Nile tributaries in northwestern Sudan such as Wadi Al-Malik, Wadi Howar and Valley of the Queens became active during the AHP and contributed sediments to the Nile. Wadi Howar was active until 4,500 years ago, and at the time often contained dune-dammed lakes, swamps and wetlands; it was the largest Saharan tributary of the Nile and constituted an important pathway into sub-Saharian Africa. Conversely it appears that Lake Victoria and Lake Albert were not overflowing into the White Nile for all of the AHP, and the White Nile would have been sustained by overflow from Lake Turkana. There appears to be a tendency over the course of the AHP for the discharge of the Blue Nile to decrease relative to that of the White Nile. The Blue Nile built an alluvial fan at its confluence with the White Nile, and incision by the Nile reduced flooding risk in some areas which thus became available for human use.

Closed lakes in East Africa rose, sometimes by hundreds of metres. Lake Suguta developed in the Suguta Valley, accompanied by the formation of river deltas where rivers such as the Baragoi River entered the lake. In turn, Lake Suguta overflowed into the Kerio River, this adding water to Lake Turkana where increased discharge by the Turkwel River led to the formation of a large river delta. Over half of the water in Lake Turkana came from the Omo River, a decline compared to present-day conditions. Lake Chamo, Lake Abaya and the Chew Bahir basins formed a river system flowing into Lake Turkana, which itself overflowed on its northwestern side through the Lotikipi Swamp into the White Nile. Deposits from this lake highstand form the Galana Boi Formation. This overflowing large lake was filled with freshwater and was populated by humans, typically in bays, along capes and protected shorelines; the societies there engaged in fishery but could probably also fall back on other resources in the region.

The enlarged lake covered a large area west of the present-day lake, present-day lakes Afambo, Gamari and Tendaho, reducing Borawli, Dama Ale and Kurub to islands. The maximum water level was reached during the early Holocene as river discharge increased, but was later limited by partial overflow and did not rise above  again. Deep thermal groundwater recharge occurred in the region. About 9,000 years of human occupation are documented at the lake. Archaeological sites indicate that people obtained resources from the lake and followed its rise and decline. The cultural traditions at Lake Abhe appear to be unusual by AHP/African standards.

Lake Zway and Lake Shala in Ethiopia joined with Lake Abiyata and Lake Langano to form a large waterbody which began overflowing into the Awash River. Other lakes that expanded include Lake Ashenge and Lake Hayq also in Ethiopia, Lake Bogoria, Lake Naivasha and Lake Nakuru/Lake Elmenteita all in Kenya, and Lake Masoko in Tanzania. Lakes formed in depressions on the mountains around Lake Kivu. Some of these lakes became connected through overflow: Lake Nakuru-Elmenteita drained northward through the Menengai caldera, Lake Baringo-Bogoria and Suguta into Lake Turkana and from there into the Nile, carving gorges along the way. Lake Naivasha drained south through Lake Siriata into Lake Magadi-Natron. Overflow of several of these lakes allowed animals including Nile crocodiles and fish to propagate to the individual lake basins, but at the same time hindered the propagation of many land-based mammals. 

Glaciers stopped retreating or briefly expanded in East Africa at the beginning of the AHP before continuing retreat. On Mount Kilimanjaro they may have expanded during the AHP after a phase during the Younger Dryas where the mountain was ice free, but the tree line also rose at that time, accompanied by soil formation. The wetter climate may have destabilized the neighbouring Mount Meru volcano, causing a giant landslide that removed its summit.

Erosion in catchments of East Africa increased with the beginning of the humid period but then decreased even before its end, as the increased weathering led to the formation of soils, these in turn to the establishment of a vegetation cover that subsequently reduced additional erosion. Increased weathering resulted in the increased consumption of atmospheric  during the AHP.

Surprisingly, and contrary to the patterns expected from precessional changes, the East African Rift also experienced a wetter climates during the AHP, reaching as far south as Lake Rukwa and Lake Cheshi into the Southern Hemisphere. In the region of the African Great Lakes, pollen evidence points to the occurrence of forests including rainforest vegetation due to the increased precipitation, while today they occur only in limited areas there. Denser vegetation also occurred at Lake Turkana, with wooden vegetation covering almost half of the dry land although grasslands remained dominant. Development of forest vegetation around the African Great Lakes created an interconnected environment where species spread, increasing biodiversity with effects on the future when the environment became fragmented. Vegetation cover also increased in the Afar region and Ericaceae plants spread at high elevations. Forests and moisture-requiring vegetation expanded in the Bale Mountains. Different types of vegetation, including dryland vegetation, existed at Lake Malawi and Lake Tanganyika however, and vegetation did not change much. A wetter climate is recorded from a soil in the Afar region.

In East Africa, the AHP led to improved environmental conditions in terms of food and water supply from large lakes, allowing early human populations to survive and grow in size without requiring major changes in food gathering strategies. Pottery techniques such as the "dotted wavy line" and "Kanysore" are associated with fishing and foraging communities. Earlier wet and dry periods in East Africa may have influenced the evolution of humans and allowed their spread across the Sahara and into Europe.

Other parts of Africa and the rainforest realm 

Lake Bosumtwi in Ghana rose during the AHP. Evidence there also suggests a decrease in wildfire activity took place. Tropical forests expanded in Cameroon Highlands and the Adamawa Plateau of Cameroon and moved upward at Lake Bambili also in Cameroon. The core of the rainforest was probably unaltered by the African humid period, perhaps with some changes in species and an expansion of their area. There is some evidence that an "Equatorial humid period", mechanistically linked to equatorial insolation and extending into the Amazon, may have taken place in the eastern Congo region at the same time as the AHP. The peatlands of Central Congo started developing during the African humid period and peat continues to accumulate there to this day, albeit with a slowdown in the Cuvette Centrale after the end of the African humid period.

On São Nicolau and Brava in the Cape Verde Islands, precipitation and erosion increased. In the Canary Islands, there is evidence of a moister climate on Fuerteventura, the laurel forests changed perhaps as a consequence of the AHP. Recharge of groundwater levels have been inferred from Gran Canaria also in the Canary Islands, followed by a decrease after the end of the AHP. Choughs may have reached the Canary Islands from North Africa when the latter was wetter.

Levant and Mediterranean 

High latitude Africa has not undergone large scale changes in the past 11,700 years; the Atlas Mountains may have blocked the monsoon from expanding further north. However, river valley and cave deposits showing a moister climate in southern Morocco, vegetation changes in the Middle Atlas, several floods in Tunisian rivers and ecosystem changes which impacted steppe-dependent rodents of Northern Africa have been linked to the AHP.

In the Pleistocene and Holocene humidity in the Mediterranean is often correlated to humidity in the Sahara, and the early-mid Holocene climate of Iberia, Italy, Negev and Northern Africa was wetter than today; in Sicily wettening correlates with ITCZ changes in Northern Africa. Mediterranean precipitation is brought by Mediterranean cyclones and the westerlies; either increased precipitation from the westerlies, northward moisture transport from Africa or monsoonal precipitation extending into the Mediterranean may have rendered it wetter. The connection between the African Monsoon and Mediterranean precipitation is unclear and it was winter rainfall that increased predominantly, although separating monsoonal and non-monsoonal precipitation can be difficult.

The Mediterranean Sea became less saline during the AHP, in part due to increased precipitation from the westerlies but also from increased river discharge in Africa, leading to the formation of sapropel layers when the increased runoff led to the Mediterranean becoming more stratified and eutrophied, with changes in the main water masses of the sea. The S1 sapropel layer is specifically associated with the AHP and with increased discharge of the Nile and other African rivers. These processes together with decreased dust transport by wind led to changes in the sediment patterns of the Mediterranean, and increased marine nutrient availability and food web productivity in the Mediterranean, which impacted the development of deep-sea corals.

In the Levant, wetter conditions during the AHP are recorded from Jeita Cave in Lebanon and Soreq Cave in Israel while the Dead Sea and other southern European lakes were low during this period. This is unlike some earlier wet periods in the Sahara; possibly the stronger winter-summer insolation gradient in these earlier wet periods created a different moisture pattern than during the Holocene. The northern Mediterranean may have been drier, with more wildfire activity, during the AHP.

Southern Africa 

The effects, if any, of the African humid period on Southern Africa have been unclear. Originally it was proposed that the orbitally driven changes would imply a dry period in Southern Africa which would have given way to moister conditions as the northern AHP ended, as the ITCZ should shift its average position between the two hemispheres. However, the lack of paleoclimatology data with sufficient time resolution from Southern Africa has made it difficult to assess the climate there during the AHP. More recently obtained paleoclimate data have suggested however that southern Africa was actually wetter during the AHP rather than drier, reaching as far as north-northwest Madagascar 23° south and as far as the catchment of the Orange River. The area between Lake Tanganyika and Lake Malawi has been interpreted as the limit of the AHP's influence.

Conversely, and consistent with the opposite reaction pattern of the Southern Hemisphere, the Zambezi River reached its lowest discharge during the AHP, and the AHP did not reach southern or southeastern Africa. There may have been opposite changes in precipitation between southeast Africa and tropical East Africa, separated by a "hinge zone". Particular changes occurred in central southern Africa, where a dry period co-occurred with an expansion of Lake Makgadikgadi; presumably the lake during this dry interval was nourished by increased wetness over the Okavango River catchment in the Angolan Highlands due to the AHP; peatlands formed in Angola during the AHP. In general there is little consistency between Northern and Southern Africa in terms of hydrological changes during the Holocene, and nowhere are both the start and end of the AHP apparent. Orbitally-mediated changes in Northern Hemisphere climate affected the Southern Hemisphere through oceanic pathways involving sea surface temperatures. Additionally, wetter periods unrelated to the AHP may have occurred after deglaciation in Southern Africa.

Numerical estimates 

Estimates of the exact amount of increased precipitation vary widely. An area with less than  may have remained in the Eastern Sahara however, although its driest parts may have received 20-fold more precipitation than today.

From lake levels precipitation increases of 20–33% or 50–100%/40-150% have been inferred for East Africa, with an increase of 40% reconstructed for Northern Africa. In the early Holocene, there appears to have been an eastward- and northward-decreasing trend of humidity. Additionally, at Tayma in Arabia a threefold increase appears to have occurred and precipitation in the Wahiba Sands of Oman may have reached .

Effect on other climate modes 

The El Niño–Southern Oscillation is a major climate variability mode. Paleoclimatology records from Ecuador and the Pacific Ocean indicate that during the early and middle Holocene ENSO variability was suppressed by about 30–60%, which can be only partially explained through orbital forcing. The Green Sahara may have suppressed ENSO activity, forcing a La Niña–like climate state, in a climate model this is accompanied by decreased upwelling and deepening of the thermocline in the Eastern Pacific as the Walker circulation shifts westward. Easterly winds in the western Pacific Ocean increase, while they decrease in the eastern. In addition, Atlantic Niño sea surface temperature patterns develop in the Atlantic Ocean.

Remote effects of the AHP on climate have also been studied, although many changes are model-dependent and may also be inaccurate due to incorrect depictions of atmospheric dust distribution. The reduced albedo of the Sahara during the AHP explains part of the warming of the Holocene thermal maximum. The AHP would also influence SSTs in the Indian Ocean, although there is not much evidence about the mid-Holocene sea temperatures there.

The Atlantic meridional overturning circulation (AMOC) transports heat from the Southern into the Northern Hemisphere and is implicated in starting the Holocene AHP an earlier AHPs after the end of an ice age. Various studies have been conducted to determine which effects reduced dust supply and the greening of the Sahara would have had on its intensity, with conflicting results on which effects would predominate. Increased heat transport either through the atmosphere or the ocean would result in warming in the Arctic.

Remote precipitation and the AHP

The Sahara greening intensified the Indian and Asian monsoons, warming and increased precipitation across most of the Tibetan Plateau especially late in the monsoon season, and climate simulations including a green Sahara reproduce the reconstructed palaeoclimates there better than these without. In a climate model, there is a shift in precipitation from snow to rain. The strengthened and expanding monsoons of Africa and Asia alter the atmospheric circulation of the planet, inducing a wetter East Asian Monsoon and drying across tropical South America and central-eastern North America. The reduced dust emission warms the North Atlantic and increases westerly flow into the North American Monsoon, strengthening it. The far-field precipitation changes reach as far as Europe and Australia. Discrepancies between modelled and reconstructed northward extension and precipitation in the Asian monsoon regions and the North American Monsoon area may be explained through these remote effects.

Sun et al. 2020 proposed that the greening of the Sahara during the AHP can increase precipitation over the Middle East even if neither the African nor the Indian monsoons reach it. During spring, the increased vegetation forces anomalous atmospheric circulations that direct moisture transport from the Mediterranean, the Red Sea and eastern tropical Africa into the Middle East, increasing precipitation and agricultural productivity there. This could explain increased precipitation in the Middle East during the AHP: A wet climate occurred in the Middle East during the early Holocene, leading to the Ubaid period of settlement in Mesopotamia, followed by dry phases around 5,500 years ago and a concomitant reduction in simulated wheat yield.

Hurricanes and the AHP

One climate model has indicated that a greener Sahara and reduced dust output would have increased tropical cyclone activity, especially over the Atlantic but also in most other tropical cyclone basins. Changes in the intensity of the storms, decreases in wind shear, changes in atmospheric circulation and less dust in the atmosphere, which results in warmer oceans, are responsible for this phenomenon, despite an expected decrease of tropical wave activity over the Atlantic in climate models. The net effect could be a global increase in tropical cyclone activity, a westward shift within the ocean basins and in the Atlantic Ocean a shift towards later dates. While there are no good paleotempestology data for the time of the African humid period that could confirm or refute this theory and many of these records are specific for particular locations, hurricane activity including past strikes in Puerto Rico and in Vieques appear to correlate with the strength of the West African Monsoon and increased precipitation on the northern Yucatan Peninsula during the middle Holocene could be explained by increased hurricane activity during the AHP. On the other hand, at Grand Bahama Bank and the Dry Tortugas of South Florida a decrease of hurricane activity took place during the AHP and dust emission is not always anti-correlated to hurricane activity. Finally, the northward movement of the ITCZ during the AHP may have caused a corresponding northward movement of tropical cyclogenesis areas and storm tracks in the Atlantic Ocean, which could also explain decreased hurricane activity in the Bahamas and Dry Tortugas.

Fluctuations 

Some gaps with less precipitation took place during the late glacial and the Holocene. During the Younger Dryas 12,500–11,500 years ago, the North Atlantic and Europe became much colder again and there was a phase of drought in the area of the African humid period, extending over both East Africa, where lake levels dropped in many places, southern Africa and West Africa. The dry interval extended to India and the Mediterranean where dune activity occurred in the Negev. At the end of the Younger Dryas, precipitation, lake levels and river runoff increased again, although south of the equator the return of humid conditions was slower than the relatively abrupt change to its north.

Another dry phase took place about 8,200 years ago, spanning East Africa and Northern Africa as documented by various lines of evidence such as decreased water levels in lakes. It coincided with cooling in the Northern Atlantic, in surrounding landmasses such as Greenland and around the world; the drought may be related to the 8.2 kiloyear event which separates the Greenlandian and Northgrippian stages of the Holocene and lasted for about one millennium. The 8,200 year event has also been noted in the Maghreb, where it is associated with a transition of the Capsian culture as well as with cultural changes both in the Sahara and the Mediterranean; at the Gobero cemetery a population change occurred after this dry interruption but the occurrence of widespread cultural changes appears to be questionable. This episode appears to have been caused by the draining of ice-dammed lakes in North America  although a low latitude origin has also been suggested.

Cooling of the Northern Atlantic during Heinrich event 1 and the Younger Dryas associated with a weaker Atlantic meridional overturning circulation leads to atmospheric pressure anomalies that shift the Tropical Easterly Jet and precipitation belts south, making Northern Africa drier.
 Storm tracks shift north away from the Mediterranean. Earlier Heinrich events were also accompanied by drought in North Africa. Likewise, a weakening of moisture transport and a less eastward position of the Congo Air Boundary contributed to reducing precipitation in East Africa although some parts of southern Africa at Lake Malawi were wetter during the Younger Dryas.

Many humidity fluctuations in the early Holocene appear to be caused by the discharge of meltwater from the Laurentide Ice Sheet into the Atlantic, which weakens the Atlantic meridional overturning circulation. Some dry periods in marine cores in the Gulf of Guinea appear to coincide with events recorded in Greenland ice cores. Other variations in precipitation observed in records have been attributed to solar activity changes, water levels of Lake Turkana for example appear to reflect the 11-year solar cycle.

In Lake Turkana, water level fluctuations took place between 8,500 and 4,500 years before present, with highstands before 8,400, around 7,000 and between 5,500 and 5,000 and lowstands around 8,000, 10,000 and 12,000 years before present. In total, five separate highstands are recorded in desert varnish around the lake. The highstands appear to be controlled by sea surface temperature patterns in the Atlantic and Indian Oceans, but also by overflow of water from Lake Suguta and Chew Bahir and upstream lakes into Lake Turkana.. Volcanic and tectonic phenomena occur at Lake Turkana, but do not have the magnitude required to explain large changes in lake level. Water level fluctuations have also been inferred for Lake Chad on the basis of pollen data, especially towards the end of the AHP. In the Taoudenni lake fluctuations of about a quarter-millennium have been recorded and frequent droughts occurred in the Eastern Sahara.

Other variations appear to have occurred 9,500–9,000 and 7,400–6,800 as well as 10,200, 8,200, 6,600 and 6,000 years before present; they were accompanied by decreased population density in parts of the Sahara, and other dry interludes in Egypt have been noted 9,400–9,300, 8,800–8,600, 7,100–6,900 and 6,100–5,900 years ago. The duration and severity of dry events is difficult to reconstruct and the impact of events like the Younger Dryas is heterogeneous even between neighbouring areas. During dry episodes, humans might have headed to waterbodies which still had resources, and cultural changes in the central Sahara have been linked to some dry episodes. Aside from fluctuations, a southward retreat of the humid period may have been underway after 8,000 years ago with a major drought around 7,800 years ago.

End 

The African humid period ended about 6,000–5,000 years ago; an ending date of 5,500 years before present is often used. After vegetation declined, the Sahara became barren and was claimed by sand. Wind erosion increased in northern Africa, and dust export from the now-desert and from dried up lakes such as the Bodélé Basin grew; Bodélé today is the largest single source of dust on Earth. The lakes dried up, mesic vegetation disappeared, and sedentary human populations were replaced by more mobile cultures. The transition from the "green Sahara" to the present-day dry Sahara is considered to be the greatest environmental transition of the Holocene in northern Africa; today almost no precipitation falls in the region. The end of the AHP but also its beginning could be considered a "climate crisis" given the strong and extended impact. Drying extended as far as the Canary Islands and southeastern Iran, and there is evidence of climate change on São Nicolau, Cape Verde.

The Piora Oscillation cold period in the Alps coincides with the end of the AHP; the period 5,600–5,000 years ago was characterized by widespread cooling and more variable precipitation changes around the world and was possibly forced by changes in solar activity and orbital parameters. Some changes in climate possibly extended into southeastern Australia, Central America and into South America. The neoglacial began.

A major pan-tropical environmental change took place about 4,000 years ago. This change was accompanied by the collapse of ancient civilizations, severe drought in Africa, Asia and the Middle East and the retreat of glaciers on Mount Kilimanjaro and Mount Kenya.

Chronology 

Whether the drying happened everywhere at the same time and whether it took place in centuries or millennia is unclear in part due to disagreeing recordsand has led to controversy, and such a disagreement on timing also exists with respect to the expected vegetation changes. Marine cores usually indicate an abrupt change but not without exceptions while pollen data do not, perhaps due to regional and local differences in vegetation. Africa is a diverse landscape and groundwater and local vegetation can modify local conditions; groundwater-fed water bodies for example persisted longer than those nourished by rain. The debate on how quickly the Sahara formed goes back to 1849, when the Prussian naturalist Alexander von Humboldt suggested that only a quick drying could form the desert.

Most recently, the idea has taken hold that the end of the African humid period occurred from north to south in a stepwise fashion. In northeastern Asia, the western Sahara and east Africa it ended within 500 years with a one-step drying 6,000 – 5,000 years ago north of the present-day monsoon belt. Farther south, precipitation decrease was more protracted and closer to the equator the AHP ended between 4,000 and 2,500 years ago. In East Africa, pronounced drying occurred between 4,500 and 3,500 years ago, centered on 4,000 years ago; Egypt during the Old Kingdom was still wetter than today. A later end in northeast Africa about 4,000 years ago may reflect the different configuration of landmasses and thus monsoon behaviour, while other research has found a westward propagating drying trend.

Some evidence points to a two-phase change in climate with two distinct dry transitions caused by the existence of two different steps of insolation decrease at which climate changes. 
Distinct environmental changes may have occurred in Central Africa, Western Africa and East Africa. Finally, sometimes the 4.2 kiloyear event - the transition from the Northgrippian to the Meghalayan stage of the Holocene - is considered to be the true end of the AHP, especially in central Africa.

Increased variability in precipitation may have preceded the end of the AHP; this is commonly observed before a sudden change in climate. In Gilf Kebir, between 6,300 and 5,200 years ago apparently a winter rainfall regime became established as the AHP ended. Later fluctuations in climate that produced brief humid spells also took place, such as a moister period between 500 BCE – 300 CE in Roman Northern Africa and along the Dead Sea and an earlier one 2,100 years before present in the western Sahel. By 2,700 years ago the central Sahara had become a desert and remained one until the present-day.

Sahara and Sahel 

After a first brief lake level drop between 5,700 and 4,700 calibrated years ago that might reflect climate variability towards the end of the African humid period, water levels in Lake Megachad decreased quickly after 5,200 years before present. It shrank to about 5% of its former size, with the deeper northern Bodele basin drying up entirely about 2,000-1,000 years ago as it was disconnected from the southern basin where its major tributary, the Chari River, enters Lake Chad. The dried out basin was now exposed to the Harmattan winds, which blow dust out of the dry lake bed, making it the single largest source of dust in the world. Dunes formed in the dried-up Sahara or began moving again after stabilizing during the AHP.

The tropical vegetation was replaced by desert vegetation, in some places suddenly and in others more gradually. Along the Atlantic coast, the vegetation retreat was slowed by a stage of sea level rise that increased soil moisture levels, delaying the retreat by about two millennia. In Libya at Wadi Tanezzuft the end of the humid period was also delayed by leftover water in dune systems and in the Tassili mountains until 2,700 years ago, when river activity finally ceased. A brief moist pulse between 5,000 – 4,000 years ago in the Tibesti led to the development of the so-called "Lower Terrace". The Egyptian Sahara might still have been vegetated until 4,200 years ago, based on depictions of savanna environments in Fifth Dynasty tombs in Egypt.

At Lake Yoa, which is groundwater-fed, vegetation decreased and became desert vegetation between 4,700–4,300 and 2,700 years ago, while the lake became hypersaline 4,000 years ago. Lake Teli dried out completely about 4,200 years ago. However, the climate of the Ounianga lakes may have been affected by the Tibesti Mountains and the end of the AHP thus delayed, and fossil groundwater left by the AHP nourishes the lake to this day. In the central Sahara, water resources in the mountains persisted longer.

East Africa and Arabia 

In northern East Africa, water levels dropped rapidly about 5,500 years ago while in Hoti cave in Arabia a southward retreat of the Indian Monsoon took place about 5,900 years ago. Drying is also documented from Oman, and rivers and lakes of Arabia became intermittent or entirely dry. The Blue Nile basin became less moist with a noticeable decrease of Nile discharge about 4,000 years ago. Decreased discharge of the Nile led to the cessation of sapropel deposition and turbidite activity off its delta, the abandonment of river channels in its delta and upstream and increased seawater influence in the delta.

Some data from Ethiopia and the Horn of Africa indicate that drying there may have begun already 7,000–8,000 years ago or earlier. Reconstructions from Lake Abiyata in Ethiopia suggest that the end of the African humid period took the form of severe droughts rather than a gradual decrease of precipitation. Drying in Arabia commenced about 7,000 calibrated years ago and there are large disparities in the timing between various parts of Arabia but a tendency towards an arid climate between 6,000 and 5,000 years ago has been observed which continued until 2,700 years ago. In the Bale Mountains and the Sanetti Plateau of Ethiopia vegetation changes signalling a drier climate took place around 4,600 years ago.

Forest cover in the area of the African Great Lakes decreased between 4,700 and 3,700 years ago, although drying at Lake Victoria had begun around 8,000 years ago, at Lake Rukwa 6,700 years ago, at Lake Tanganyika about 6,000 years ago and at Lake Edward major changes in lake chemistry consistent with drying are noted 5,200 years ago. There a minor recovery in vegetation took place between 2,500 and 2,000 years ago, followed by a much more rapid appearance of grasses accompanied also by substantial wildfire activity. This might have been the most severe drought of the Lake Edward region in the Holocene, with many lakes such as Lake George dropping significantly or drying up altogether. Other lakes such as Nakuru, Turkana, Lake Chew Bahir, Lake Abbe and Lake Zway also dropped between 5,400 and 4,200 years ago. Decreased vegetation cover in the catchment of the Blue Nile has been correlated with increased sediment transport in the river beginning 3,600 – 4,000 years ago.

The end of the AHP at Lake Turkana occurred about 5,000-5,300 years before present, accompanied by a lake level decline and the cessation of overflow from other lakes in its area into Lake Turkana. Between 5,000 and 4,200, Lake Turkana became more saline and its water levels decreased below the level of outflow to the Nile. Towards the end of the AHP water temperatures in the lake and in other regional lakes appear to have increased, followed by a drop after its end possibly resulting from the insolation seasonality pattern that was in force at the time of the end of the AHP. The decrease of water levels in Lake Turkana also impacted the Nile and the Predynastic societies dependent on it.

Mediterranean 

The southern Aegean, Libya and the Middle Atlas became gradually more dry, and drying in Morocco took place about 6,000 radiocarbon years ago, Drier conditions in Iberia accompanied the end of the African humid period between 6,000 and 4,000 years ago, perhaps as a consequence of increasingly frequent positive North Atlantic Oscillation episodes and the shift of the ITCZ. More complicated changes have been found for the northern margin of the Mediterranean, and winter rainfall increased in the Levant at the end of the AHP. A 4.2 kiloyear event is recorded in dust records from the Mediterranean and might have been caused by changes in the circulation of the Atlantic Ocean.

Tropical West Africa 

In Lake Bosumtwi the African humid period ended about 3,000 years ago after a brief moistening between 5,410 ± 80 years ago that ended 3,170 ± 70 years ago. This, earlier but similar changes off western Senegal and later but similar changes in the Congo Fan appear to reflect a southward shift of the precipitation zone over time. Some drying occurred simultaneously between the Sahel and the Gulf of Guinea. Some lakes in the Guineo-Congolian region dried out, while others were relatively unaffected.

A general tendency towards a drier climate is observed in West Africa at the end of the AHP. There, dense vegetation became progressively thinner between 5,000 and 3,000 years ago, and major perturbations of the vegetation took place around 4,200 and 3,000–2,500 /2,400 calibrated years ago. A brief return of moister conditions took place 4,000 years ago while a substantial dry phase occurred between 3,500 and 1,700 years ago. Aridity became established between 5,200 and 3,600 years ago in the Sahara. In Senegal modern-type vegetation arose about 2,000 years ago.

Central Africa 

Farther south at the equator between 6,100 and 3,000 calibrated years before present savannah expanded at the expense of forests, with the transition possibly lasting until 2,500 calibrated years before present; a different time course estimate for the area between 4° southern and 7° northern latitude states that forest cover decreased between 4,500 and 1,300 years ago. In the Adamawa Plateau (Cameroon), the Ubangui Plateau (Central African Republic) and the Cameroon Volcanic Line montane forests disappeared at the end of the African humid period. In the Adamawa Plateau savanna has continuously expanded since 4,000 calibrated years ago. Such a change took also place in Benin and Nigeria between 4,500 and 3,400 calibrated years ago. In the Congo Basin, there were changes in the composition and density of the forests rather than their extent, and along the equator precipitation may have increased around 4.2 ka. Many vegetation changes in the tropical regions were probably caused by a longer dry season and perhaps a smaller latitudinal range of the ITCZ.

Southern Hemisphere Africa 

In the Southern Hemisphere at Lake Malawi drying began later – 1,000 years before present – as did the African humid period which there began only about 8,000 years ago. Contrarily, increased water levels in Etosha Pan (Namibia) appear to relate to a southward movement of the ITCZ at the end of the AHP although stalagmite growth data in Dante Cave also in Namibia has been interpreted as indicating a wetter climate during the AHP. Several records indicate that 5,500 years ago, precipitation changed in an east-west dipole-like way with drying in the west and moistening in the east. This pattern was probably driven by shifts in atmospheric moisture transport and of rain belt width.

Mechanisms 

The end of the humid period appears to reflect the changes in insolation during the Holocene, as a progressive decrease of summer insolation caused the insolation gradients between Earth's hemispheres to decrease. However, the drying appears to have been much more abrupt than the insolation changes; it is not clear whether non-linear feedbacks led to abrupt changes in climate and it is also unclear whether the process, driven by orbital changes, was abrupt. Also, the Southern Hemisphere warmed and this resulted in a southward shift of the ITCZ; orbitally-driven insolation has increased over the Holocene in the Southern Hemisphere.

As precipitation decreased, so did vegetation, in turn increasing the albedo and further decreasing precipitation. Furthermore, vegetation may have responded to increased variations in precipitation towards the end of the AHP although this view has been challenged. This could have directed sudden changes in precipitation, although this view has been cast in doubt by the observation that in many places the end of the African humid period was gradual rather than sudden. Plants at higher and lower latitudes might respond differently to climate change; for example more diverse plant communities might have slowed down the end of the AHP.

Other proposed mechanisms:
 Decreases in polar insolation through altered cosmic ray fluxes might promote the growth of sea ice and cooling at high latitudes, which in turn result in stronger equator-to-pole temperature gradients, stronger subtropical anticyclones and more intense upwelling in for example the Benguela current.
 Changes in the circulation of high latitude oceans may have played a role, such as the potential occurrence of another meltwater/ice rafting pulse around 5,700 years before present. The decreased insolation during the mid-Holocene may have made the climate system more sensitive to changes, explaining why earlier comparable pulses did not terminate the humid period for good.
 There is evidence that glaciers in Tibet such as at Nanga Parbat expanded during the Holocene, especially towards the end of the AHP. In climate models, increased snow and ice on the Tibetan Plateau can lead to a weakening of the Indian and African monsoons, with the weakening of the former preceding that of the latter by 1,500–2,000 years. 
 Decreases in sea surface temperatures of the Indian Ocean may be involved in the drying of East Africa, but there is no agreement on the temperature records from that ocean. Moreover, there is no evidence of temperature changes in the Gulf of Guinea at the critical time that might explain the end of the AHP.
 Additional feedback processes may have included the drying of soils and loss of vegetation after decreased rainfall, which would have led to wind-driven deflation of the soils.
 An expansion of sea ice around Greenland, Ellesmere Island 6,000 and Antarctica about 5,000 calibrated years ago may have provided another positive feedback.
 The expanding dry belt of the Sahara pushed the regions of cyclogenesis in the Mediterranean northwest-northward, resulting in wind changes and precipitation regime changes in parts of Italy. 
 Climate change at high latitudes has been proposed as a cause for the end of the AHP. Specifically, about 6,000–5,000 years ago the Arctic became colder, with sea ice expanding, temperatures in Europe and off Northern Africa decreasing and the Atlantic meridional overturning circulation weakening. This cooling tendency may have weakened the Tropical Easterly Jet and thus reduced the amount of precipitation falling over Africa.

The orbitally-induced changes of precipitation may have been modified by the solar cycle; specifically, solar activity maxima during the ending phase of the AHP may have offset the orbital effect and thus stabilized precipitation levels, while solar activity minima compounded the orbital effects and thus induced rapid decreases in water levels of Lake Turkana. At Lake Victoria on the other hand, solar variations appear to sometimes lead to drought and sometimes lead to wetness, probably due to changes in the ITCZ.

Potentially human-mediated changes 

Major changes in vegetation in East Africa about 2,000 years ago may have been caused by human activity, including large-scale deforestation for iron production during the Iron Age. Similar changes have been observed on the Adamawa Plateau (Cameroon) but later dating of archaeological sites has found no correlation between human expansion in Cameroon and environmental degradation. Similar rainforest degradation across Western African took place between 3,000 and 2,000 years ago and the degradation is also known as "third millennium rainforest crisis". Climate-mediated processes may have increased the impact of land use changes in East Africa. In the Sudanian and Sahelian savannah on the other hand human activity seems to have had little impact, and in Central Africa forest changes were clearly triggered by climate change with little or no evidence of anthropogenic changes. The question has led to intense debate among paleoecologists and archaeologists.

While humans were active in Africa during the end of the African humid period, climate models analyzed by Claussen and colleagues 1999 indicate that its end does not need any human activity as an explanation although vegetation changes may have been induced by human activity. Later it was suggested that overgrazing may have triggered the end of the AHP around 5,500 years ago; human influence might explain why the Sahara became a desert without the accompanying onset of an ice age; usually the existence of a Sahara desert is associated with the expansion of high latitude glaciers. Later research has on the contrary suggested that human pastoralism may have actually delayed the end of the AHP by half a millennium as moving herds of animals driven by humans seeking good pasture conditions may lead to more balanced impacts of pastures on the vegetation and thus to greater vegetation quality. However, increased grazing has been invoked to explain the increase in dust emissions after the end of the AHP. The effects of grazing on vegetation cover are context-dependent and hard to generalize over wider regions.

Global 

A general drying tendency is observed in the northern tropics and between 5,000 – 4,500 calibrated years ago the monsoons weakened. Perhaps as a consequence of the end of the AHP, Asian monsoon precipitation declined between 5,000 and 4,000 years ago. A drought 5,500 years ago is recorded in Mongolia and eastern America, where drought conditions around 5,500–5,000 years ago occurred in places like Florida and between New Hampshire and Ontario. A drying tendency is also noted in the Caribbean and the Central Atlantic. The final retreat of vegetation from the Sahara may have helped cause the 4.2 kiloyear event.

Conversely, in South America there is evidence that the monsoon behaves in an opposite fashion consistent with precessional forcing; water levels in Lake Titicaca were low during the middle Holocene and began to rise again after the end of the AHP. Likewise, a trend towards increased wetness took place in the Rocky Mountains at this time although it was accompanied by a drier phase around Lake Tahoe, California and in the Western United States.

Consequences

Humans 

As observed in archaeological sites, settlement activity decreased in the Sahara after the AHP. Population in Northern Africa decreased between 6,300 and 5,200 years ago over less than a millennium, beginning from the north. In inner Arabia many settlements were abandoned about 5,300 years ago. Some Neolithic people in the desert persisted for longer thanks to the exploitation of groundwater.

Different human populations responded to the drying in diverse manners, with responses in the Western Sahara being distinct from those in the Central Sahara. In the Central Sahara, pastoralism replaced hunter-gatherer activity and a more nomadic lifestyle replaced semi-sedentary lifestyles as observed in the Acacus Mountains of Libya. Nomadic lifestyles also developed in the Eastern Sahara/Red Sea Hills in response to the end of the AHP. There was a shift in domestic animal use from cattle to sheep and goats as these are more suited in arid climates, a change reflected in rock art from which cattle disappeared at this time.

The development of irrigation systems in Arabia may have been an adaptation to the drying tendency. The decreased availability of resources forced human populations to adapt, in general fishing and hunting declined in favour of farming and herding. However, the effects of the end of the AHP on human food production have been subject to controversy.

The warm episode and coinciding drought may have triggered animal and human migration to less inhospitable areas and the appearance of pastoralists where previously fishery-dependent societies had existed, as happened at Lake Turkana. Humans moved to the Nile, where the society of Ancient Egypt with pharaohs and pyramids was eventually forged by these climate refugees perhaps reflecting renewed exuberance; thus the end of the AHP can be considered responsible for the birth of Ancient Egypt. Lower water levels in the Nile also aided the settlement of its valley as has been observed at Kerma. A similar process may have led to the development of the Garamantian civilization. Such human migrations towards more hospitable conditions along rivers and the development of irrigation also took place along the Euphrates, Tigris and Indus, leading to the development of the Sumerian and Harappan civilizations. Population shifts into mountain areas have also been reported for the Air Mountains, Hoggar and Tibesti. In other places, such as the Acacus Mountains populations conversely remained in oases and hunter-gatherers also stayed in the Horn of Africa.

The Nile itself was not totally unaffected however; the 4.2 kiloyear event and the end of the AHP may be linked to the collapse of the Old Kingdom in Egypt when the Nile floods failed for three decades around 4,160 years before present and the final drying occurred. The ongoing decrease of precipitation after the end of the AHP could be the cause of the end of the Akkadian Kingdom in Mesopotamia. The end of the Garamantian civilization may also relate to climate change although other historical events were probably more important; at Tanezzuft oasis after 1,600 years ago it certainly relates to the drying trend.

In Central Africa, forests became discontinuous and savannahs formed in some places, facilitating the movement and growth of Bantu speaking populations; these in turn may have affected the ecosystem. The vegetation changes may have aided in the establishment of agriculture. The relatively slow decline of precipitation gave humans more time to adapt to the changing climate conditions. In East Africa, the beginning of the "Pastoral Neolithic" and the appearance of Nderit pottery have been attributed to the climatic changes at the end of the AHP.

Cultural changes may also have occurred as a consequence of climate change, such as changes in gender roles, the development of elites, the increased presence of human burials where formerly cattle burials predominated, as well as an increase of monumental architecture in the Sahara may have also been a response to increasingly adverse climates. A spread in cattle domestication at the time of climate change and as herders escaped the drying Sahara southwards may also relate to these events, although the details of the exact process by which cattle domestication spread are still controversial. Finally, changes in agricultural practices at the end of the AHP may be associated with the propagation of malaria and one of its causative pathogens Plasmodium falciparum; in turn these may correlate with the origin of human genome variants such as sickle cell disease that are linked to malaria resistance.

Non-human 

In the Sahara, animal and plant populations were fragmented and restricted to certain favoured areas such as moist areas of mountain ranges; this happened for example to fish and crocodiles which only persist in isolated water bodies. Mediterranean plants such as cypresses too persist only in mountains, along with some reptiles that may have also been stranded in mountains by the drying. The whip spider Musicodamon atlanteus is probably also a relic of past wetter conditions. The buffalo species Syncerus antiquus probably went extinct from the increased competition of pastoralists triggered by the climate drying. Goat populations in Ethiopia shrunk during the droughts that followed the end of the AHP and lion habitat declined across Africa. The drying of the African Great Lakes region split gorilla populations into western and eastern populations, and a similar population split between the insect species Chalinus albitibialis and Chalinus timnaensis in Northern Africa and the Middle East may have also been caused by the expansion of deserts there. Some aquatic species disappeared from the Sahara. Giraffes, widespread in the Sahara during the AHP, may have been forced to migrate into the Sahel; this together with the separating effect of Lake Megachad may have influenced the development of giraffe subspecies. Climate change together with human impacts may have led to the extinction of a number of large mammals in Egypt. In northern Madagascar, wildlife declined after the end of the AHP even before the arrival of humans. On the other hand, the decline of tree cover may have grown the niche available to domestic animals and some drought-tolerant plant species may have expanded their range.

The Dahomey Gap formed 4,500–3,200 years before present, correlative to the end of the AHP. The harbour porpoise declined in the Mediterranean due to a switch to oligotrophic conditions as discharge from African rivers decreased. Desert varnish formed on exposed rocks in the Sahara and at Lake Turkana in East Africa.

Global climate 

The shrinkage of subtropical wetlands probably led to a drop in atmospheric methane concentrations between 5,500 and 5,000 years ago, before boreal wetlands expanded and offset the loss of subtropical wetlands, leading to a return of higher atmospheric methane concentrations. Conversely, increases in atmospheric methane concentrations, detected in Greenland ice cores about 14,700 years ago, and atmospheric carbon dioxide decreases in the early Holocene may relate to the vegetation expansion caused by the AHP. Carbon dioxide concentration then increased after about 7,000 years as the biosphere began releasing carbon in response to increasing aridity.

A sudden increase in the amount of land-originating dust in an oceanic drill core off Cape Blanc, Mauritania, has been interpreted as reflecting the end of the AHP 5,500 years ago occurring in only a few centuries. Increased African dust deposition took place at Ciomadul and the Durmitor Massif, both in Europe. Potentially, alluvial sediments emplaced during the AHP and dried up lake basins became an important source for dust and silt-sized particles. Today, the Sahara is the single largest source of dust in the world, with far ranging effects on climate and ecosystems, such as the growth of the Amazon rainforest.

In one climate model, the desertification of the Sahara at the end of the AHP reduces the amount of heat transported in the atmosphere and ocean towards the poles, inducing cooling of  especially in winter in the Arctic and an expansion of sea ice. Reconstructed temperatures in the Arctic indeed show a cooling, although less pronounced than in the climate model. Further, this climate transition in the climate model is accompanied by increased negative Arctic Oscillation states, a weaker subpolar gyre and increased precipitation and cold air outbreaks in much of Europe; such changes have also been observed in paleoclimate data. These findings imply that the vegetation state of the Sahara influences the Northern Hemisphere climate. In turn, this high latitude cooling may have further reduced precipitation over Africa.

Present-day situation 

Presently, the African Monsoon still influences the climate between 5° south and 25° north latitude; the latitudes around 10° north receive the bulk of their precipitation from the monsoon during summer, with smaller amounts of rainfall occurring farther north. Thus farther north deserts can be found while the moister areas are vegetated. Even farther north, the margin of the desert coincides with the area where the westerlies bring precipitation; they also influence southernmost Africa. Subsidence of air over parts of Northern Africa is responsible for the existence of deserts, which is further increased by the radiative cooling over the desert. Climate variability exists to this day, with the Sahel suffering from droughts in the 1970s and 1980s when precipitation decreased by 30% and the flow of the Niger River and Senegal River even more, followed by an increase of precipitation. The droughts are one of the most significant climate anomalies of the 20th century. Sea surface temperatures and feedbacks from land surface conditions modulate the strength of the monsoon and the droughts may have been triggered by sea surface temperature changes forced by anthropogenic aerosols. A large increase in dust fluxes after 1800 AD has been explained with changed agricultural practices.

In East Africa the monsoon leads to two rain seasons in the equatorial area, the so-called "long rains" in March–May and the "short rains" in October–November when the ITCZ moves northward and southward over the region, respectively; in addition to the Indian Ocean-sourced precipitation there is also Atlantic- and Congo-sourced precipitation west of the Congo Air Boundary. In Arabia, the monsoon does not penetrate far from the Arabian Sea and some areas are under the influence of winter precipitation brought by cyclones from the Mediterranean Sea. East Africa is also under the influence of monsoon circulations. South Africa has both monsoonal climates, winter precipitation climates and climates without clear precipitation seasonality.

Implications for future global warming 

Some simulations of global warming and increased carbon dioxide concentrations have shown a substantial increase in precipitation in the Sahel/Sahara. This and the increased plant growth directly induced by carbon dioxide could lead to an expansion of vegetation into present-day desert, although it would be less extensive than during the mid-Holocene and perhaps accompanied by a northward shift of the desert, i.e. a drying of northernmost Africa. Such a precipitation increase may also reduce the amount of dust originating in Northern Africa, with effects on hurricane activity in the Atlantic and increased threats of hurricane strikes in the Caribbean, the Gulf of Mexico and the East Coast of the United States of America.

The Special Report on Global Warming of 1.5 °C and the IPCC Fifth Assessment Report indicate that global warming will likely result in increased precipitation across most of East Africa, parts of Central Africa and the principal wet season of West Africa, although there is significant uncertainty related to these projections especially for West Africa. In addition, the end of the 20th century drying trend may be due to global warming. On the other hand, West Africa and parts of East Africa may become drier during given seasons and months. Currently, the Sahel is becoming greener but precipitation has not fully recovered to levels reached in the mid-20th century.

Climate models have yielded equivocal results about the effects of anthropogenic global warming on the Sahara/Sahel precipitation. Human-caused climate change occurs through different mechanisms than the natural climate change that led to the AHP, in particular through increased inter-hemispheric temperature gradients. The direct effect of heat on plants may be detrimental. One study in 2003 showed that vegetation intrusions in the Sahara can occur within decades after strong rises in atmospheric carbon dioxide but would not cover more than about 45% of the Sahara. That climate study also indicated that vegetation expansion can only occur if grazing or other perturbations to vegetation growth do not hamper it. On the other hand, increased irrigation and other measures to increase vegetation growth such as the Great Green Wall could enhance it. A 2022 study indicated that while increased greenhouse gas concentrations by themselves are not sufficient to start an AHP if greenhouse gas-vegetation feedbacks are ignored, they lower the threshold for orbital changes to induce Sahara greening.

Plans to geoengineer the Sahara to increase its vegetation cover and precipitation have been proposed since the 19th century. The mechanisms and consequences of the AHP are important context to evaluate such proposals and their ramifications; precipitation may increase but the consumption of carbon dioxide would be small and there could be detrimental impacts on climate and dust fluxes in the far-field. Building large solar farms in the Sahara desert would also act to decrease its albedo and may trigger similar climate responses.

A greening of the Sahara on the one hand may allow agriculture and pastoralism to expand into hitherto unsuitable areas, but increased precipitation can also lead to increased water borne diseases and flooding. Expanded human activity resulting from a wetter climate may be vulnerable to climate reversals as demonstrated by the droughts that followed the mid-20th century wet period.

See also 

 Sahara pump theory

Notes

References

Sources 

 
 
 
 
 
 
 
 
 
 
 
 
 
 
 
 
 
 
 
 
 
 
 
 
 
 
 
 
 
 
 
 
 
 
 
 
 
 
 
 
 
 
 
 
 
 
 
 
 
 ar

External links 
 
 
 
 

History of climate variability and change
Holocene Africa
2000s neologisms
Pleistocene events
Natural history of Africa
Natural history of Asia
Historical eras